Samaresh Jung (born 5 May 1970) is an Indian sport shooter. He is an air pistol specialist. At the 2002 Commonwealth Games in Manchester, he won two gold medals, in the men's free pistol pairs and in the open event of 25 m standard pistol pairs, both in partnership with Jaspal Rana. He contested in the 10 m air pistol and 50 m pistol events at the 2008 Summer Olympics in Beijing, but failed to reach the finals in both events.

He received the Arjuna award in 2002. He is employed with the CISF and lives in New Delhi.

On 3 October 2010, he had the honour of bearing the Queen's Baton in its Opening Ceremony run in the stadium for the 2010 Commonwealth Games of Delhi.

Early life
Samresh Jung was born on 5 May 1970, in Haripur khol Nahan Himachal Pradesh. Son of a retired colonel of the Indian Army, Jung learnt the art of shooting from his grandfather, Sher Jung, who was a freedom fighter, besides being an ace shooter.

Jung completed his preliminary education from the Modern School in Delhi. Thereafter, he enrolled himself at the Osmania University in Hyderabad, from where he gained his graduation degree. Very few people know that he is a good player of chess too.

Career

2006 Commonwealth Games

At the 2006 Commonwealth Games, he was in contention for eight medals. Starting off with a silver, he finally won five Gold, one silver and one bronze. After winning the one silver and five Gold, nerves got the better of him in the 25m centrefire pistol individual event where he could manage only a bronze. In the standard fire pistol individual competition, his gun malfunctioned and he fell out of contention for a medal in that event. He was given the David Dixon Award at the closing ceremony, an award given to the "most outstanding athlete at the 18th Commonwealth Games". He was dubbed "Goldfinger" by the volunteers at the Games .

Awards and medals
2002
Arjuna Award
Commonwealth Games: 2 gold medals (men's free pistol pairs and open standard pistol pairs, each with Jaspal Rana) and 3 silver medals (air pistol individual, free pistol individual, and free pistol pairs, the last with Rana)
2004
SAF Games: 1 silver medal (25m standard pistol)
2005
Fifth Commonwealth Shooting Championship: 2 gold medals, 2 silver medals, and 1 bronze medal
Indian National Games: 1 gold medal (10m air pistol)
2006
Commonwealth Games: David Dixon Award (as best athlete of the Games); 5 gold medals (men's 50m pistol, men's 10m air pistol, men's 25m centre fire pistol pairs (with Rana), men's 10m air pistol pairs (with Vivek Singh, and men's 25m standard pistol pairs (with Ronak Pandit), 1 silver medal (men's 50m pistol pairs with Singh), and 1 bronze medal (men's 25m centre fire pistol)

Personal life 
He married Anuja Jung.

References

General references
Samresh Jung's profile, images and news
News item about Jung's performance at 2006 Commonwealth Games
Samaresh Jung on Ministry of Youth Affairs & Sports, Government of India website
5 December 2005 News Story in The Hindu about Samaresh Jung's defense in 2005 National Games.
2004 SAF Games report
, Melbourne
2006 Commonwealth Games

Citations

Indian male sport shooters
ISSF pistol shooters
1970 births
Living people
Commonwealth Games gold medallists for India
Commonwealth Games silver medallists for India
Commonwealth Games bronze medallists for India
Shooters at the 2002 Commonwealth Games
Shooters at the 2006 Commonwealth Games
Olympic shooters of India
Shooters at the 2008 Summer Olympics
Shooters at the 2010 Commonwealth Games
People from Sirmaur district
Sport shooters from Himachal Pradesh
Asian Games medalists in shooting
Shooters at the 2002 Asian Games
Shooters at the 2006 Asian Games
Shooters at the 2010 Asian Games
Shooters at the 2014 Asian Games
Asian Games gold medalists for India
Asian Games silver medalists for India
Asian Games bronze medalists for India
Commonwealth Games medallists in shooting
Medalists at the 2006 Asian Games
Medalists at the 2014 Asian Games
Recipients of the Arjuna Award
21st-century Indian people
Medallists at the 2002 Commonwealth Games
Medallists at the 2006 Commonwealth Games
Medallists at the 2010 Commonwealth Games